The 1991 Milwaukee Brewers season involved the Brewers' finishing 4th in the American League East with a record of 83 wins and 79 losses, after having had a record of 43-60 on August 3rd

Offseason
 March 14, 1991: Dave Parker was traded by the Brewers to the California Angels for Dante Bichette.

Regular season

Season standings

Record vs. opponents

Notable transactions
 April 2, 1991: Willie Randolph was signed as a free agent by the Brewers.
 May 25, 1991: Carmelo Castillo was signed as a free agent by the Brewers.
 August 9, 1991: Candy Maldonado was traded by the Brewers to the Toronto Blue Jays for Rob Wishnevski (minors) and a player to be named later. The Blue Jays completed the deal by sending William Suero to the Brewers on August 14.

Roster

Player stats

Batting

Starters by position
Note: Pos = Position; G = Games played; AB = At bats; H = Hits; Avg. = Batting average; HR = Home runs; RBI = Runs batted in

Other batters
Note: G = Games played; AB = At bats; H = Hits; Avg. = Batting average; HR = Home runs; RBI = Runs batted in

Pitching

Starting pitchers
Note: G = Games pitched; IP = Innings pitched; W = Wins; L = Losses; ERA = Earned run average; SO = Strikeouts

Other pitchers
Note: G = Games pitched; IP = Innings pitched; W = Wins; L = Losses; ERA = Earned run average; SO = Strikeouts

Relief pitchers
Note: G = Games pitched; W = Wins; L = Losses; SV = Saves; ERA = Earned run average; SO = Strikeouts

Awards and honors
 Bill Wegman, Hutch Award

Farm system

The Brewers' farm system consisted of seven minor league affiliates in 1991. The Denver Zephyrs won the American Association championship.

Notes

External links 
1991 Milwaukee Brewers team page at Baseball Reference
1991 Milwaukee Brewers team page at www.baseball-almanac.com

Milwaukee Brewers seasons
Milwaukee Brewers season
Milwaukee Brew